is a male Japanese politician.

He served as a Minister of Justice and occupied a seat in the House of Councillors.

Akira's personal intimacy with Kakuei Tanaka is well known.

Hatano ran for Governor of Tokyo in 1971, but he was defeated by incumbent Governor Ryokichi Minobe.

Earlier life 
Akira had the career of a superintendent general of Tokyo Metropolitan Police Department.

Politician 

Ministers of Justice of Japan
Members of the House of Councillors (Japan)
Tokyo gubernatorial candidates
Japanese police officers
Nihon University alumni
People from Fujisawa, Kanagawa
1911 births
2002 deaths